Glaphyrus is a genus of beetles belonging to the family Glaphyridae.

Species
 Glaphyrus aulicus
 Glaphyrus calvaster
 Glaphyrus caucasicus
 Glaphyrus cinnaberinus
 Glaphyrus comosus
 Glaphyrus festivus
 Glaphyrus haroldi
 Glaphyrus laufferi
 Glaphyrus luristanus
 Glaphyrus maurus
 Glaphyrus micans
 Glaphyrus modestus
 Glaphyrus muticus
 Glaphyrus olivieri
 Glaphyrus onopordi
 Glaphyrus opulentus
 Glaphyrus ornatus
 Glaphyrus oxypterus
 Glaphyrus panousei
 Glaphyrus pubescens
 Glaphyrus reymondi
 Glaphyrus rothi
 Glaphyrus serratulae
 Glaphyrus superbus
 Glaphyrus turkestanicus
 Glaphyrus varians
 Glaphyrus viridicollis

References

Scarabaeoidea genera